Angela Elaine Naeth is a Canadian triathlete with numerous successes including winning the North American Ironman National Championships May 16 at The Woodlands, Texas., She has 19 70.3 titles to her name, 36 podiums, 5+ podium IM, and 3 full Ironman wins -  all under 9 hours. She is the founder of the largest global all women's endurance team: IRACELIKEAGIRL www.iracelikeagirl.com, and endurance coach.

On October 13, 2018, Angela finished in 8th place at the Ironman World Championships in Kailua-Kona, Hawai’i in a time of 8:57:34  She was diagnosed with Lyme in early 2018, and has been an advocate and world-class competitor while treating the illness.

References

External links 
 

Canadian female triathletes
American female triathletes
1982 births
Living people
21st-century American women